Wali Faisal (born 1 March 1985) is a Bangladeshi international footballer who plays as a defender for Bangladesh national football team and Mohammedan SC.

Early life
Wali was born at Narayanganj, one of the oldest cities in Bangladesh, in 1985. While he was in 3rd and 4th grade in school, he produced great performance for his district team and attracted interest from both Abahani-Mohammedan. He traveled to Dhaka to watch league games of his maternal uncle Abdullah Parbez, who was a player of Team BJMC. Faisal was introduced to and participated in sports in the supervision of Abdullah.

Club career
Despite the family reluctance, Wali was very attracted to his football career. Wali's academy coach Azmal Khandakar was impressed by his football skills. Seeing his playing style, late Monem Munna, ex captain of both the Bangladesh National football team and Abahani Limited, was impressed and invited him to play in the junior team of Abahani Limited.

References

Bangladeshi footballers
1985 births
Bangladesh international footballers
Living people
Footballers from Dhaka
Mohammedan SC (Dhaka) players
Abahani Limited (Dhaka) players
Sheikh Jamal Dhanmondi Club players
Footballers at the 2006 Asian Games
Footballers at the 2010 Asian Games
People from Narayanganj District
Association football defenders
Asian Games competitors for Bangladesh
Rahmatganj MFS players